Karl Heinrich Alban, Count of Schönburg-Forderglaucha (11 November 1804 – 23 March 1864) was the head of the mediatised German Counts of Schönburg-Glauchau from 1815 until his death in 1864.

Early life
Schönburg was born in Dresden-Neustadt in the Electorate of Saxony on 11 November 1804. He was the eldest son of Count Wilhelm Albrecht Heinrich von Schönburg-Forderglauchau (1762–1815) and Countess Anna Albertine Leopoldine Wilhelmine von Wartensleben (1775–1826). His younger brother was Ernst Ferdinand Heinrich von Schönburg-Forderglauchau.

His paternal grandfather was Count Karl Heinrich von Schönburg-Forderglauchau (1729–1800) and Countess Christiane Wilhelmine von Einsiedel.

Career
Upon his father's death in 1815, he became head of the Schönburg-Forderglauchau branch of the family.

Personal life

In 1824, he was married to the Countess Christiane Mary Emilie von Jenison-Walworth (1806–1880), a daughter of Count Franz von Jenison-Walworth and, his second wife, the former Mary Beauclerk (a daughter of Topham Beauclerk, who was himself a great-grandson of King Charles II, and Lady Diana Spencer, a daughter of the 3rd Duke of Marlborough). Together, they were the parents of five children:

 Marie Emillie zu Schönburg-Forderglauchau (1825–1869), who married Bavarian Reichsrat Count Otto von Quadt-Wykradt-Isny in 1846. He was brother to Count Friedrich von Quadt-Wykradt-Isny, the Bavarian Envoy to France.
 Karl Heinrich von Schönburg-Forderglauchau (1826–1826), who died young.
 Ida von Schönburg-Forderglauchau (1829–1902), who married Baron Bernhard von Fabrice in 1853.
 Olga-Claire von Schönburg-Forderglauchau (1831–1868), who married Wilhelm, Prince of Löwenstein-Wertheim-Freudenberg in 1852.
 Karl von Schönburg-Glauchau (1832–1898), who married Countess Adelheid von Rechteren-Limpurg-Speckfeld, a daughter of Friedrich Ludwig von Rechteren-Limpurg-Speckfeld, in 1864. After her death in 1873, he married Countess Sophie d'Ursel, a daughter of Léon, 5th Duke d'Ursel (and sister to Charles Joseph Marie, 6th Duke d'Ursel), in 1879.

Schönburg died in Dresden on 23 March 1864.

Descendants
Through his daughter Olga, he was a grandfather of Prince Ludwig of Löwenstein-Wertheim-Freudenberg, who married Lady Anne Savile, daughter of John Savile, 4th Earl of Mexborough.

References

1804 births
1864 deaths
Karl Heinrich Alban